Valery Solovei (born 19 August 1960) is a Russian political scientist, historian, and former head of the Public Relations Department at the Moscow State Institute of International Relations (MGIMO). He resigned from the MGIMO on June 19, 2019 after being requested by the University administration.

References

1960 births
Living people
20th-century Russian historians
21st-century Russian historians
People listed in Russia as foreign agents
Russian nationalists
Moscow State University alumni
Academic staff of the Moscow State Institute of International Relations
Scholars of nationalism
Russian conspiracy theorists
Russian political scientists